Botstein is a surname. Notable people with the surname include:

 David Botstein (born 1942), American biologist
 Leon Botstein (born 1946), Swiss-American conductor, academic administrator, and scholar